Donavon is a hamlet in Montrose Rural Municipality 315, Saskatchewan, Canada. The hamlet is located southwest of Saskatoon along Highway 45 and Canadian National Railway, Delisle-Tichfield Junction stub.

The name is a combination of the Don River (Ontario) and the Avon River (Ontario).

Gallery 
Points of interest in Donavon, Saskatchewan and area.

See also 

 List of communities in Saskatchewan
 Hamlets of Saskatchewan

References

Montrose No. 315, Saskatchewan
Unincorporated communities in Saskatchewan